Mounira Hmani Aifa (born 1972) is a Tunisian geneticist, best known for her work in mapping the PRSS56 gene. She has been a recipient of the "Sur les traces de Marie Curie" award from UNESCO and the L'Oreal Foundation in 2012, and a fellowship from them in 2002. 

Aifa is from Sfax, in Tunisia, and currently teaches and researches at the Sfax Biotechnology Center. In 2002, she won the L'Oréal-UNESCO For Women in Science Award, which allowed her to pursue post-graduate research in human genetics at the Faculty of Medical Sciences in Linköping, Sweden. She continued this research in Tunisia, working on a project which studied the genetic origins of hereditary deafness. She also pursued research on posterior microphthalmia, a rare genetic condition affecting the eye, for which she mapped the PRSS56 gene, and established its potential links with a type of glaucoma. In 2012, she was awarded the  "Sur les traces de Marie Curie" from UNESCO and the L'Oreal Foundation for this research.

References 

1972 births

Living people
People from Sfax

Tunisian women scientists
Tunisian geneticists
21st-century women scientists
Women geneticists